Jakob Meisenheimer (14 June 1876 – 2 December 1934) was a German chemist. He made numerous contributions to organic chemistry, the most famous being his proposed structure for a group of compounds now named Meisenheimer complex.  He also proposed the mechanism of the Beckmann rearrangement. Later in his career, he reported the synthesis of the pyridine-N-oxide.

References

 

1876 births
1934 deaths
20th-century German chemists
Academic staff of the University of Greifswald
Scientists from Frankfurt